The 1896 United States presidential election in Louisiana took place on November 3, 1896. All contemporary 45 states were part of the 1896 United States presidential election. State voters chose eight electors to the Electoral College, which selected the president and vice president.

Louisiana was won by the Democratic nominees, former U.S. Representative William Jennings Bryan of Nebraska and his running mate Arthur Sewall of Maine. Four electors cast their vice presidential ballots for Thomas E. Watson.

Results

See also
 United States presidential elections in Louisiana

References

Louisiana
1896
1896 Louisiana elections